William Thomas Culpepper III (born January 23, 1947) was a  Democratic member of the North Carolina General Assembly representing the state's second House district, including constituents in Chowan, Dare, Gates, Perquimans and Tyrrell counties.  A lawyer from Edenton, North Carolina, Culpepper was the Chairman of the House Rules Committee from 1999 until 2005. Regarded as the greatest and most powerful Rules Chairman of all time, Culpepper will be remembered as the main architect of the co-speakership (James B. Black and Richard T. Morgan) in 2003 and the driving force behind passage of the state's education lottery in 2005.

Culpepper resigned from the legislature in 2006 when he was appointed by Governor Mike Easley to North Carolina's Utilities Commission. In 2015, he became General Counsel for the N.C. Office of Administrative Hearings.

A graduate of Hampden–Sydney College and Wake Forest University School of Law, Culpepper was a third generation member of the North Carolina House of Representatives.  He is the father of two sons, William T. Culpepper, IV, an attorney in Charlotte, and W. Gardner Culpepper.  He has one grandchild, William T. Culpepper, V.

References

External links
NC Utilities Commission

|-

Living people
Democratic Party members of the North Carolina House of Representatives
People from Edenton, North Carolina
North Carolina lawyers
Hampden–Sydney College alumni
Wake Forest University School of Law alumni
1947 births
21st-century American politicians